The Black Stone ('Black Stone') is a rock set into the eastern corner of the Kaaba, the ancient building in the center of the Grand Mosque in Mecca, Saudi Arabia. It is revered by Muslims as an Islamic relic which, according to Muslim tradition, dates back to the time of Adam and Eve.

The stone was venerated at the Kaaba in pre-Islamic pagan times. According to Islamic tradition, it was set intact into the Kaaba's wall by the Islamic prophet Muhammad in 605 CE, five years before his first revelation. Since then, it has been broken into fragments and is now cemented into a silver frame in the side of the Kaaba. Its physical appearance is that of a fragmented dark rock, polished smooth by the hands of pilgrims. Islamic tradition holds that it fell from heaven as a guide for Adam and Eve to build an altar. It has often been described as a meteorite.

Muslim pilgrims circle the Kaaba as a part of the tawaf ritual during the hajj and many try to stop to kiss the Black Stone, emulating the kiss that Islamic tradition records that it received from Muhammad. While Muslims revere the Black Stone, they do not worship it.

Physical description 

The Black Stone was originally a single piece of rock but today consists of several pieces that have been cemented together. They are surrounded by a silver frame which is fastened by silver nails to the Kaaba's outer wall. The fragments are themselves made up of smaller pieces which have been combined to form the seven or eight fragments visible today. Its original size is unclear and the recorded dimensions have changed considerably over time, as the pieces have been rearranged in their cement matrix on several occasions. In the 10th century, an observer described the Black Stone as being one cubit long.

The Black Stone is attached to the east corner of the Kaaba, known as al-Rukn al-Aswad (the 'Corner of the Black Stone'). Another stone, known as the Hajar as-Sa’adah ('Stone of Felicity') is set into the Kaaba's opposite corner, al-Rukn al-Yamani (the 'Yemeni Corner'), at a somewhat lower height than the Black Stone. The choice of the east corner may have had ritual significance; it faces the rain-bringing east wind (al-qabul) and the direction from which Canopus rises.

The silver frame around the Black Stone and the black kiswah or cloth enveloping the Kaaba were for centuries maintained by the Ottoman Sultans in their role as Custodian of the Two Holy Mosques. The frames wore out over time due to the constant handling by pilgrims and were periodically replaced. Worn-out frames were brought back to Istanbul, where they are still kept as part of the sacred relics in the Topkapı Palace.

Appearance of the Black Stone
The Black Stone was described by European travellers to Arabia in the 19th- and early-20th centuries, who visited the Kaaba disguised as pilgrims. Swiss traveller Johann Ludwig Burckhardt visited Mecca in 1814, and provided a detailed description in his 1829 book Travels in Arabia:

Visiting the Kaaba in 1853, Richard Francis Burton noted that:

Ritter von Laurin, the Austrian consul-general in Egypt, was able to inspect a fragment of the Stone removed by Muhammad Ali in 1817 and reported that it had a pitch-black exterior and a silver-grey, fine-grained interior in which tiny cubes of a bottle-green material were embedded. There are reportedly a few white or yellow spots on the face of the Stone, and it is officially described as being white with the exception of the face.

History and tradition 

The Black Stone was held in reverence well before Islam. It had long been associated with the Kaaba, which was built in the pre-Islamic period and was a site of pilgrimage of Nabataeans who visited the shrine once a year to perform their pilgrimage. The Kaaba held 360 idols of the Meccan gods. The Semitic cultures of the Middle East had a tradition of using unusual stones to mark places of worship, a phenomenon which is reflected in the Hebrew Bible as well as the Quran, while bowing, worshiping and praying to such sacred objects is also described in the Tanakh as idolatrous and was the subject of prophetic rebuke. The meteorite-origin theory of the Black Stone has seen it likened by some writers to the meteorite which was placed and worshipped in the Greek Temple of Artemis.

The Kaaba has been associated with fertility rites of Arabia. Some writers remark on the apparent similarity of the Black Stone and its frame to the external female genitalia. However, the silver frame was placed on the Black Stone to secure the fragments, after the original stone was broken.

A "red stone" was associated with the deity of the south Arabian city of Ghaiman, and there was a "white stone" in the Kaaba of al-Abalat (near the city of Tabala, south of Mecca). Worship at that time period was often associated with stone reverence, mountains, special rock formations, or distinctive trees. The Kaaba marked the location where the sacred world intersected with the profane, and the embedded Black Stone was a further symbol of this as an object as a link between heaven and earth. Aziz Al-Azmeh claims that the divine name ar-Rahman (one of the names of God in Islam and cognate to one of the Jewish names of God Ha'Rachaman, both meaning "the Merciful One" or "the Gracious One") was used for astral gods in Mecca and might have been associated with the Black Stone. The stone is also thought to be associated with Allat. Muhammad is said to have called the stone "the right hand of al-Rahman".

Muhammad 
According to Islamic belief Muhammad is credited with setting the Black Stone in the current place in the wall of the Kaaba. A story found in Ibn Ishaq's Sirah Rasul Allah tells how the clans of Mecca renovated the Kaaba following a major fire which had partly destroyed the structure. The Black Stone had been temporarily removed to facilitate the rebuilding work. The clans could not agree on which one of them should have the honour of setting the Black Stone back in its place.

They decided to wait for the next man to come through the gate and ask him to make the decision. That person was 35-year-old Muhammad, five years before his prophethood. He asked the elders of the clans to bring him a cloth and put the Black Stone in its centre. Each of the clan leaders held the corners of the cloth and carried the Black Stone to the right spot. Then, Muhammad set the stone in place, satisfying the honour of all of the clans. After his Conquest of Mecca in 630, Muhammad is said to have ridden round the Kaaba seven times on his camel, touching the Black Stone with his stick in a gesture of reverence.

Desecrations
The Stone has suffered repeated desecrations and damage over the course of time. It is said to have been struck and smashed to pieces by a stone fired from a catapult during the Umayyad Caliphate's siege of Mecca in 683. The fragments were rejoined by Abd Allah ibn al-Zubayr using a silver ligament. In January 930, it was stolen by the Qarmatians, who carried the Black Stone away to their base in Hajar (modern Eastern Arabia). According to Ottoman historian Qutb al-Din, writing in 1857, the Qarmatian leader Abu Tahir al-Jannabi set the Black Stone up in his own mosque, the Masjid al-Dirar, with the intention of redirecting the hajj away from Mecca. This failed, as pilgrims continued to venerate the spot where the Black Stone had been.

According to the historian al-Juwayni, the Stone was returned twenty-three years later, in 952. The Qarmatians held the Black Stone for ransom, and forced the Abbasids to pay a huge sum for its return. It was wrapped in a sack and thrown into the Friday Mosque of Kufa, accompanied by a note saying "By command we took it, and by command we have brought it back." Its abduction and removal caused further damage, breaking the stone into seven pieces. Its abductor, Abu Tahir, is said to have met a terrible fate; according to Qutb al-Din, "the filthy Abu Tahir was afflicted with a gangrenous sore, his flesh was eaten away by worms, and he died a most terrible death." To protect the shattered stone, the custodians of the Kaaba commissioned a pair of Meccan goldsmiths to build a silver frame to surround it, and it has been enclosed in a similar frame ever since.

In the 11th century, a man allegedly sent by the Fatimid caliph al-Hakim bi-Amr Allah attempted to smash the Black Stone but was killed on the spot, having caused only slight damage. In 1674, according to Johann Ludwig Burckhardt, someone allegedly smeared the Black Stone with excrement so that "every one who kissed it retired with a sullied beard". According to the archaic Sunni belief, by the accusation of one boy, the Persian of an unknown faith was suspected of sacrilege, where Sunnis of Mecca "have turned the circumstance to their own advantage" by assaulting, beating random Persians and forbidding them from Hajj until the ban was overturned by the order of Muhammad Ali. The explorer Sir Richard Francis Burton pointed out on the alleged "excrement action" that "it is scarcely necessary to say that a Shi'a, as well as a Sunni, would look upon such an action with lively horror", and that the real culprit was "some Jew or Christian, who risked his life to gratify a furious bigotry".

Ritual role 

The Black Stone plays a central role in the ritual of istilam, when pilgrims kiss the Black Stone, touch it with their hands or raise their hands towards it while repeating the takbir, "God is Greatest". They perform this in the course of walking seven times around the Kaaba in a counterclockwise direction (tawaf), emulating the actions of Muhammad. At the end of each circuit, they perform istilam and may approach the Black Stone to kiss it at the end of tawaf. In modern times, large crowds make it practically impossible for everyone to kiss the stone, so it is currently acceptable to point in the direction of the Stone on each of their seven circuits around the Kaaba. Some even say that the Stone is best considered simply as a marker, useful in keeping count of the ritual circumambulations  that one has performed.

Writing in Dawn in Madinah: A Pilgrim's Progress, Muzaffar Iqbal described his experience of venerating the Black Stone during a pilgrimage to Mecca:

The Black Stone and the Kaaba's opposite corner, al-Rukn al-Yamani, are both often perfumed by the mosque's custodians. This can cause problems for pilgrims in the state of ihram ("consecration"), who are forbidden from using scented products and will require a kaffara (donation) as a penance if they touch either.

Meaning and symbolism 

Islamic tradition holds that the Black Stone fell from Jannah to show Adam and Eve where to build an altar, which became the first temple on Earth.
Muslims believe that the stone was originally pure and dazzling white, but has since turned black because of the sins of the people who touch it. Its black colour is deemed to symbolize the essential spiritual virtue of detachment and poverty for God (faqr) and the extinction of ego required to progress towards God (qalb).

According to a prophetic tradition, "Touching them both (the Black Stone and al-Rukn al-Yamani) is an expiation for sins." Adam's altar and the stone were said to have been lost during Noah's Flood and forgotten. Ibrahim (Abraham) was said to have later found the Black Stone at the original site of Adam's altar when the angel Jibrail revealed it to him.  Ibrahim ordered his son Ismael – who in Muslim belief is an ancestor of Muhammad – to build a new temple, the Kaaba, into which the stone was to be embedded.

Another tradition says that the Black Stone was originally an angel that had been placed by God in the Garden of Eden to guard Adam. The angel was absent when Adam ate the forbidden fruit and was punished by being turned into a jewel – the Black Stone. God granted it the power of speech and placed it at the top of Abu Qubays, a mountain in the historic region of Khurasan, before moving the mountain to Mecca. When Ibrahim took the Black Stone from Abu Qubays to build the Kaaba, the mountain asked Ibrahim to intercede with God so that it would not be returned to Khurasan and would stay in Mecca.

According to some scholars, the Black Stone was the same stone that Islamic tradition describes as greeting Muhammad before his prophethood. This led to a debate about whether the Black Stone's greeting comprised actual speech or merely a sound, and following that, whether the stone was a living creature or an inanimate object. Whichever was the case, the stone was held to be a symbol of prophethood.

A hadith records that, when the second Caliph Umar ibn al-Khattab (580–644) came to kiss the stone, he said in front of all assembled: "No doubt, I know that you are a stone and can neither harm anyone nor benefit anyone. Had I not seen Allah's Messenger [Muhammad] kissing you, I would not have kissed you." In the hadith collection Kanz al-Ummal, it is recorded that Ali responded to Umar, saying, "This stone (Hajar Aswad) can indeed benefit and harm. ... Allah says in Quran that he created human beings from the progeny of Adam and made them witness over themselves and asked them, 'Am I not your creator?' Upon this, all of them confirmed it. Thus Allah wrote this confirmation. And this stone has a pair of eyes, ears and a tongue and it opened its mouth upon the order of Allah, who put that confirmation in it and ordered to witness it to all those worshippers who come for Hajj."

Muhammad Labib al-Batanuni, writing in 1911, commented on the practice that the pre-Islamic practice of venerating stones (including the Black Stone) arose not because such stones are "sacred for their own sake, but because of their relation to something holy and respected".  The Indian Islamic scholar Muhammad Hamidullah summed up the meaning of the Black Stone:

In recent years several literalist views of the Black Stone have emerged. A small minority accepts as literally true a hadith, usually taken as allegorical, which asserts that "the Stone will appear on the Day of Judgement (Qiyamah) with eyes to see and a tongue to speak, and give evidence in favour of all who kissed it in true devotion, but speak out against whoever indulged in gossip or profane conversations during his circumambulation of the Kaaba".

Scientific origins 
The nature of the Black Stone has been much debated. It has been described variously as basalt stone, an agate, a piece of natural glass or—most popularly—a stony meteorite. , the curator of the Austro-Hungarian imperial collection of minerals, published the first comprehensive analysis of the Black Stone in 1857, in which he favoured a meteoritic origin for the stone. Robert Dietz and John McHone proposed in 1974 that the Black Stone was actually an agate, judging from its physical attributes and a report by an Arab geologist that the stone contained clearly discernible diffusion banding characteristic of agates.

A significant clue to its nature is provided by an account of the stone's recovery in 951 CE, after it had been stolen 21 years earlier. According to a chronicler, the stone was identified by its ability to float in water. If this account is accurate, it would rule out the Black Stone being an agate, a basalt lava, or a stony meteorite, though it would be compatible with it being glass or pumice.

Elsebeth Thomsen of the University of Copenhagen proposed a different hypothesis in 1980. She suggested that the Black Stone may be a glass fragment, or impactite, from the impact of a fragmented meteorite that fell 6,000 years ago at Wabar,<ref>{{cite journal|title=New Light on the Origin of the Holy Black Stone of the Ka'ba|last=Thomsen|first=E.|journal=Meteoritics|volume=15|number=1|page=87|bibcode = 1980Metic..15...87T|doi = 10.1111/j.1945-5100.1980.tb00176.x|year = 1980}}</ref> a site in the Rub' al Khali desert 1,100 km east of Mecca. A 2004 scientific analysis of the Wabar site suggests that the impact event happened much more recently than first thought and might have occurred within the last 200–300 years.

The meteoritic hypothesis is viewed by geologists as doubtful. The British Natural History Museum suggests that it may be a pseudometeorite; in other words, a terrestrial rock mistakenly attributed to a meteoritic origin.

The Black Stone has never been analysed with modern scientific techniques and its origins remain the subject of speculation.

 See also  
 Baetylus

References
Citations

Bibliography

 Grunebaum, G. E. von (1970). Classical Islam: A History 600 A.D.–1258 A.D.. Aldine Publishing Company. 
 Sheikh Safi-ur-Rahman al-Mubarkpuri (2002). Ar-Raheeq Al-Makhtum (The Sealed Nectar): Biography of the Prophet. Dar-us-Salam Publications. .
 Elliott, Jeri (1992). Your Door to Arabia. .
 Mohamed, Mamdouh N. (1996). Hajj to Umrah: From A to Z. Amana Publications. .
 Time-Life Books (1988). Time Frame AD 600–800: The March of Islam'', .

Islamic pilgrimages
Stones
Sacred rocks
Hajj
Kaaba
Meteorites in culture
Hajj terminology